Leuropus rubellus is a species of beetle in the family Carabidae, the only species in the genus Leuropus.

References

Lebiinae